The WC (Western Central) postcode area, also known as the London WC postcode area, is a group of postcode districts in central London, England. The area covered is of high density development, and includes parts of the City of Westminster and the London Boroughs of Camden and Islington, plus a very small part of the City of London.

The WC1 and WC2 postcode districts are relatively recent, having been established in 1917. When the districts are used for purposes other than the sorting of mail, such as for geographic reference and on street signs, their subdivisions - featuring letter suffixes - are often omitted.

Postal administration
WC1 and WC2 postcode districts are part of the London post town. Until created in 1917 they comprised the WC postal district. There are no postally-recognised localities used in them. No great recoding in this postcode area took place from 1990 to 2007.

Post Offices in WC1 are at Grays Inn, Marchmont Street, Southampton Row, at High Holborn and nearby parallel New Oxford Street and in the other clustered at Aldwych and Strand. The Western Central District Office was on New Oxford Street, a stop on the underground London Post Office Railway. Deliveries for the area come from Mount Pleasant Mail Centre, west of Farringdon Road.

List of postcode districts
The postcode districts are, with approximate coverage:

 
! WC1A
| LONDON
| New Oxford Street
| Camden
|-
! WC1B
| LONDON
| Bloomsbury, British Museum, Southampton Row
| Camden
|-
! WC1E
| LONDON
| Birkbeck College, University College London, SOAS
| Camden
|-
! WC1H
| LONDON
| St Pancras, UCL Institute of Education
| Camden
|-
! WC1N
| LONDON
| Russell Square, Great Ormond Street
| Camden
|-
! WC1R
| LONDON
| Gray's Inn
| Camden
|-
! WC1V
| LONDON
| High Holborn
| Camden, City of London
|-
! WC1X
| LONDON
| Kings Cross, Finsbury (west), Clerkenwell (north)
| Camden, Islington
|-
! WC2A
| LONDON
| Lincoln's Inn Fields, Royal Courts of Justice, Chancery Lane
| Camden, Westminster, City of London
|-
! WC2B
| LONDON
| Drury Lane, Kingsway, Aldwych
| Camden, Westminster
|-
! WC2E
| LONDON
| Covent Garden
| Westminster
|-
! WC2H
| LONDON
| Leicester Square, St. Giles
| Camden, Westminster
|-
! WC2N
| LONDON
| Charing Cross
| Westminster
|-
! WC2R
| LONDON
| Somerset House, Temple (west)
| Westminster 
|}

Boundaries

WC1
The WC1 postcode district is roughly bounded by Amwell Street, Rosebery Avenue and Gray's Inn Road to the east; New Oxford Street and High Holborn to the south (the boundary with WC2); Tottenham Court Road to the west; and Euston Road and Pentonville Road to the north, and approximately corresponds to the modern district of Bloomsbury, with parts of Holborn, King's Cross and St Pancras. It includes Russell Square, Tavistock Square and Coram's Fields. It is mostly within the London Borough of Camden, although a small part towards the east is within the London Borough of Islington. It includes the British Museum and buildings owned by the federal University of London and its constituent colleges and institutes.

WC2
The WC2 postcode district is roughly bounded by Chancery Lane and Essex Street to the east, High Holborn and New Oxford Street to the north (the boundary with WC1), Wardour Street and Witcomb Street to the west and Northumberland Avenue and the River Thames to the south. It includes Leicester Square, Trafalgar Square and the Aldwych. It corresponds roughly to the former district of Strand. It is mostly within the City of Westminster with the northern section in the London Borough of Camden and some small areas in the east in the City of London. It includes Somerset House, colleges of the University of London like King's College London (Strand campus), and the National Portrait Gallery.

Map

See also
Postcode Address File
List of postcode areas in the United Kingdom
London postal district
Central London
West End of London

References

External links
Royal Mail's Postcode Address File
A quick introduction to Royal Mail's Postcode Address File (PAF)

Postcode areas covering London
Media and communications in the London Borough of Camden
Media and communications in the City of Westminster
Media and communications in the London Borough of Islington
Media and communications in the City of London